The Rev. William Dudley Moore House, in Anderson County, Kentucky near Lawrenceburg, was built in c.1848-50.  It was listed on the National Register of Historic Places in 1979.  The listing included seven contributing buildings and two contributing structures.

The main house is an I-house. It was "the lifelong home of the county's most well-known and most-beloved minister. During his long career spanning half a century, Brother Moore, as he chose to be called, performed 928 marriages, 1400 funerals, and over 1,000 baptisms. Architecturally, the Reverend Moore House is notable in being a frame "I" house-with-ell, unaltered since 1900. Along with the house is an amazingly intact complex of eleven outbuildings, all frame and all apparently of no later construction than 1900."

References

National Register of Historic Places in Anderson County, Kentucky
Houses completed in 1848
1848 establishments in Kentucky
I-houses in Kentucky